Andrew Hay (born 5 November 1973) is an English former professional rugby league footballer who played in the 1990s and 2000s, and has coached in the 2000s and 2010s. He played at representative level for Emerging England, England and Yorkshire, and at club level for the Castleford Tigers (Heritage № 687), Sheffield Eagles, Leeds Rhinos, Widnes Vikings and the Doncaster Lakers (Heritage 907) and has coached at club level for the Castleford Tigers (Assistant Coach under Terry Matterson (2005–11)), Hull F.C. (Assistant Coach under Peter Gentle (2012–13)), Salford Red Devils (assistant coach) and Featherstone Rovers.

Background
Andy Hay was born in Airedale, Castleford, West Riding of Yorkshire, England.

Playing career
Andy Hay played as an interchange/substitute (replacing  Grant Anderson on 63-minutes) in Castleford Tigers' 33–2 victory over Wigan in the 1993–94 Regal Trophy Final during the 1993–94 season at Headingley, Leeds on Saturday 22 January 1994.

Hay played for Leeds from the substitute bench in their 1998 Super League Grand Final loss to Wigan. Hay was an England international and played at the 2000 Rugby League World Cup, scoring two tries in consecutive games against Russia and Fiji respectively.

Coaching career

On 16 May 2014, he left the assistant coach role at the Salford Red Devils to take up the head coach role at Kingstone Press Championship club Featherstone Rovers.

On 25 Aug 2021 it was announced by Rugby League Deutschland that Andy had been appointed as their new performance director

References

External links
(archived by web.archive.org) The Teams:England
(archived by web.archive.org) Profile at thecastlefordtigers.co.uk

1973 births
Living people
Castleford Tigers players
Doncaster R.L.F.C. players
English rugby league coaches
English rugby league players
England Knights national rugby league team players
England national rugby league team players
Featherstone Rovers coaches
Great Britain national rugby league team players
Leeds Rhinos players
Rugby league players from Castleford
Rugby league second-rows
Sheffield Eagles (1984) players
Widnes Vikings players
Yorkshire rugby league team players